Are Crooks Dishonest? is a 1918 American short comedy film featuring Harold Lloyd. Prints of the film survive in the film archives of The Museum of Modern Art and Filmoteca Española.

Plot
Con artists Harold (Harold Lloyd) and Snub (Snub Pollard) try to con the "not easily outwitted" Miss Goulash (Bebe Daniels) and her father.

Cast
 Harold Lloyd as Harold
 Bebe Daniels as Miss Goulash
 Snub Pollard as Snub (credited as Harry Pollard)
 William Blaisdell
 Sammy Brooks
 Lige Conley
 William Gillespie
 Helen Gilmore as Old lady in park
 Lew Harvey
 Gus Leonard as Old man in park
 Charles Stevenson (credited as C.E. Stevenson)

See also
 Harold Lloyd filmography

References

External links

Are Crooks Dishonest? on YouTube

1918 films
1918 comedy films
1918 short films
Silent American comedy films
American silent short films
American black-and-white films
Films directed by Gilbert Pratt
American comedy short films
1910s American films